The 2000 French Open was a tennis tournament that took place on the outdoor clay courts at the Stade Roland Garros in Paris, France. The tournament was held from 29 May until 11 June. It was the 104th staging of the French Open, and the second Grand Slam tennis event of 2000.

Seniors

Men's singles

 Gustavo Kuerten defeated  Magnus Norman, 6–2, 6–3, 2–6, 7–6(8–6)
• It was Kuerten's 2nd career Grand Slam singles title and his 2nd title at the French Open. It was Kuerten's 3rd title of the year, and his 8th overall.

Women's singles

 Mary Pierce defeated  Conchita Martínez, 6–2, 7–5
• It was Pierce's 2nd and last career Grand Slam singles title and her 1st title at the French Open. It was Pierce's 2nd title of the year, and her 15th overall.

Men's doubles

 Todd Woodbridge /  Mark Woodforde defeated  Paul Haarhuis /  Sandon Stolle, 7–6(9–7), 6–4 
• It was Woodbridge's 10th career Grand Slam doubles title and his 1st and only title at the French Open.
• It was Woodforde's 11th career Grand Slam doubles title and his 1st and only title at the French Open.

Women's doubles

 Martina Hingis /  Mary Pierce defeated  Virginia Ruano /  Paola Suárez, 6–2, 6–4
• It was Hingis' 8th career Grand Slam doubles title and her 2nd and last title at the French Open.
• It was Pierce's 1st and only career Grand Slam doubles title.

Mixed doubles

 Mariaan de Swardt /  David Adams defeated  Rennae Stubbs /  Todd Woodbridge, 6–3, 3–6, 6–3
• It was de Swardt's 2nd and last career Grand Slam mixed doubles title and her 1st title at the French Open.
• It was Adams's 2nd and last career Grand Slam mixed doubles title and his 1st title at the French Open.

Juniors

Boys' singles
 Paul-Henri Mathieu defeated  Tommy Robredo, 3–6, 7–6(7–3), 6–2

Girls' singles
 Virginie Razzano defeated  María Emilia Salerni, 5–7, 6–4, 8–6

Boys' doubles
 Marc López /  Tommy Robredo defeated  Joachim Johansson /  Andy Roddick, 7–6(7–2), 6–0

Girls' doubles
 Maria José Martinez /  Anabel Medina Garrigues defeated  Matea Mezak /  Dinara Safina, 6–0, 6–1

Prize money

Total prize money for the event was FF69,163,000.

Notes

External links
 French Open official website

 
2000 in French tennis
2000 in Paris
May 2000 sports events in France
June 2000 sports events in France